The Vata pagan uprising was a Hungarian rebellion which, in 1046, brought about the overthrow of King Peter Urseolo, the martyrdom of Bishop Gerard of Csanád and the reinstatement of the Árpád dynasty on the Hungarian throne.

Background 
Christianity had been introduced in Hungary by the King Stephen I of Hungary. Upon his death in 1038, he was succeeded by his sororal nephew Peter Urseolo, a Venetian noble. Through tax increases, and Urseolo's involvement with foreign powers, he proved to be an unpopular ruler. The Hungarian peasants, still largely pagan, suspected he was intent on bringing Hungary into the fold of the Holy Roman Empire. In a rebellion in 1041, Stephen's brother-in-law Samuel Aba took control of the throne, overthrowing Urseolo. Urseolo fled to Bavaria, in exile allying himself with German king and Holy Roman Emperor Henry III.

In the years that followed, Aba's reign weakened, likely due to opposition from the church, who disliked his catering to pagan beliefs. With support from Henry, Peter Urseolo returned to Hungary in 1044, defeating Aba at the Battle of Ménfő. Urseolo regained the throne, but Hungary became a vassal of the Holy Roman Empire, though it was not to remain so for long. However, his second reign would prove to be even more short-lived than his first.

Rebellion and Vata's mob
Andrew (András in Hungarian), Béla and Levente were the sons of Vazul, cousin of Saint Stephen. During the reign of Samuel Aba, they had fled the country in fear of their lives, Béla to Poland and András and Levente  to Kiev. In 1046, András and Levente returned to Újvár (today: Abaújvár) in Hungary from their exile and quickly gained popular support for the throne, especially among the pagan populace, despite the fact that András was Christian (Levente had remained pagan). On their return, a rebellion began, which András and Levente initially supported.

The pagan Vata (or Vatha), lord of the castle of Békés and leader of a Hungarian tribe in Körösvidék (Crișana) was a longstanding enemy of the king. He adopted Christianity to preserve his positions, but continued to practice paganism.

When the opportunity came, he started the uprising of the masses which quickly spread to all of Eastern Hungary. He had the intention of destroying Christianity in Hungary.

King Peter is said to have fled towards Székesfehérvár, where he was killed by the rebellious townspeople, and András, as the oldest brother, pronounced himself king. As András and Levente's men moved towards Pest, the bishops Gerard, Besztrik, Buldi and Beneta gathered to greet them.

In Pest, on September 24, the bishops were attacked by Vata's mob, who began stoning the bishops. Buldi was stoned to death. As the pagans threw rocks at him, Gellért repeatedly made the sign of the cross, which further infuriated the pagans. Gellért was taken up Kelenhegy hill, where he was put into a cart and pushed off a cliff, onto the banks of the Danube. Besztrik and Beneta managed to flee across the river, where Besztrik was injured by pagans before they could be rescued by András and Levente. Only Beneta survived.

Gellért was later canonized for his martyrdom and the hill from which he had been thrown was renamed Gellért Hill. Now in central Budapest, the hill has a monument on the cliff where Gellért, now a patron saint of Hungary, was killed.

Aftermath 
The Vatha uprising marked the last major attempt at stopping Christian rule in Hungary. While Andrew had received assistance from pagans in his rise to the throne, he had no plans to abolish Christianity in the kingdom. Once in power he distanced himself from Vatha and the pagans. However, they were not punished for their actions.

References

Sources

 
 

1046 in Europe
1046 riots
11th century in Hungary
11th-century rebellions
Pagan restorations
Persecution of Pagans
Revolutions in Hungary
Riots and civil disorder in Hungary